Luís Carlos Lima de Souza (born 1 June 1977, in São Paulo) is a Brazilian former football player.

Football career
Luís Carlos was signed by FC Sion in January 2003 from Carajás of Pará state. He played in FC Sion until summer 2007 joined Yverdon-Sport.

Honours 
Sion
Swiss Cup: 2005–06

References

External links
 Brazilian FA Database
http://www.football.ch/sfl/777843/de/Kader.aspx?pId=574431

1977 births
Living people
Brazilian footballers
Brazilian expatriate footballers
Association football midfielders
FC Sion players
Swiss Super League players
Expatriate footballers in Switzerland
Footballers from São Paulo